Everything for Gloria is a 1941 German romantic comedy film directed by Carl Boese and starring Leo Slezak, Laura Solari and Johannes Riemann. The film was shot at the Cinecittà in Rome, and marked the German debut of the Italian actress Solari.

Plot
The ambitious female chief executive of a gramophone record company, slowly finds herself falling in love with the company's head of production.

Partial cast
Leo Slezak as chamber singer Möbius
Laura Solari as Regine Möbius
Johannes Riemann as Dr. Herbert Gerlach
Lizzi Waldmüller as Anita Rodino
Hans Fidesser as Fernando Rodino
O. E. Hasse as Dr. Heinz
Henry Lorenzen as Max-Egon Schuster-Köhler
Erika Helmke as Hidegard Schuster-Köhler
Hermann Pfeiffer as Franz Momber
Herbert Weissbach as Eduard Wiesel, acoustician
Harald Foehr-Waldeck as Erich
Bert Schmidt-Maris as Viktor

References

External links

Films of Nazi Germany
German romantic comedy films
German black-and-white films
1941 romantic comedy films
Films directed by Carl Boese
Films shot in Rome
Films shot at Cinecittà Studios
1940s German films